Chestnut Hill West station is a SEPTA Regional Rail station in Philadelphia, Pennsylvania. Located at 9 West Evergreen Avenue in the Chestnut Hill neighborhood, it serves the Chestnut Hill West Line. It was originally built by the Philadelphia, Germantown and Chestnut Hill Railroad between 1883 and 1884, and later acquired by the Pennsylvania Railroad. In 1918, when the line was electrified, the station was rebuilt to accommodate the upgrade.

The station is in zone 2 on the Chestnut Hill West Line, on former Pennsylvania Railroad tracks, and is 11.3 track miles from Suburban Station. In 2013, this station saw 433 boardings and 479 alightings on an average weekday.

SEPTA Bus connections
SEPTA City Buses 
Routes 23, 77, and L

SEPTA Suburban Buses 
Routes 94 and 97

Station layout

References

External links

SEPTA – Chestnut Hill West Station
2005 Rob Mandeville Photo
Chestnut Hill West Station (WorldNYCSubway.org)
 Station House from Google Maps Street View

SEPTA Regional Rail stations
Former Pennsylvania Railroad stations
Railway stations in the United States opened in 1884
Railway stations in Philadelphia